The 2016 Puerto Rican general elections were held in Puerto Rico on Tuesday, November 8, 2016 to elect the officials of the Puerto Rican government that will serve from January 2017 to January 2021, most notably the Governor of Puerto Rico. Rossello was elected Governor of Puerto Rico with the second lowest percentage of votes. The election also resulted in a historic 23% drop in turnout. 2016's participation was the lowest voter turnout in Puerto Rican history. Rossello would go on to serve a 2 year term, having to resign on August 2, 2019 after historic protests as a result of the Telegramgate scandal. Wanda Vázquez Garced succeeded Rossello.

Governor of Puerto Rico

Nominations
Before the election year, the Constitution of Puerto Rico provides for any qualified person to present their candidacy for a specific position. If two or more candidates from the same party present their candidacy for the same position, and they can't reach an agreement within the party, a primary election is held. This election is held within the inscribed members of each party, to select which of the candidates will represent the party in the general election.

Both of the main parties: New Progressive Party (PNP) and Popular Democratic Party (PPD), held primaries for several positions on June 5, 2016.

New Progressive Party (PNP)

The primaries were held on June 5, 2016 to determine candidates for Governor of Puerto Rico, the Senate, House of Representatives, and others.

Popular Democratic Party (PPD)

The primaries were held on June 5, 2016 to determine several candidates for the Senate, House of Representatives, and others.

Minor parties
Two minor parties officialized their gubernatorial candidates. The Working People's Party (PPT) nominated Rafael Bernabe once again. The Puerto Rican Independence Party (PIP) nominated María de Lourdes Santiago.

Independents
As of November 2015, two independent candidates expressed their interest in running for Governor:
Alexandra Lúgaro, attorney
Manuel Cidre, businessman

Final candidates

Governor

The official candidates for the position of Governor of Puerto Rico are:
 David Bernier, Popular Democratic Party (PPD)
 Ricky Rosselló, New Progressive Party (PNP)
 María de Lourdes Santiago, Puerto Rican Independence Party (PIP)
 Rafael Bernabe Riefkohl, Working People's Party of Puerto Rico (PPT)
 Alexandra Lúgaro, Independent candidate
 Manuel Cidre, Independent candidate

Resident Commissioner

The official candidates for the position of Resident Commissioner of Puerto Rico are:
 Héctor Ferrer, Popular Democratic Party (PPD)
 Jenniffer González, New Progressive Party (PNP)
 Hugo Rodríguez, Puerto Rican Independence Party (PIP)
 Mariana Nogales, Working People's Party of Puerto Rico (PPT)

Senate of Puerto Rico

At-large

The ballot featured sixteen (16) candidates from four different parties and one independent candidate (bold denotes incumbent candidates)

New Progressive Party (PNP)
 Zoé Laboy
 Abel Nazario
 Margarita Nolasco
 Itzamar Peña
 Thomas Rivera Schatz
 Larry Seilhamer

Popular Democratic Party (PPD)
 Eduardo Bhatia
 Rossana López León
 José Nadal Power
 Miguel Pereira
 Cirilo Tirado Rivera
 Aníbal José Torres

Other parties
 Juan Dalmau (PIP)
 Amarilis Pagán (PPT)
 José Vargas Vidot (Independent)

District

San Juan
 Angel "Luigi" Alicea (PIP)
 Ada Álvarez Conde (PPD)
 Edda López Serrano (PIP)
 Henry Neumann (PNP)
 Ramón Luis Nieves (PPD)
 Miguel Romero (PNP)
 María Gisela Rosado Almedina (PPT)
 Maritza Stanchich (PPT)

Bayamón
 Noel Berríos Díaz (PIP)
 Carlos Córdova Iturregui (PPT)
 José A. Ojeda Santos (PIP)
 Migdalia Padilla (PNP)
 Carmelo Ríos Santiago (PNP)
 Ana Lydia Robles (PPD)
 Antonio J. Serrano (PPD)
 Ivette Torres Roig

Arecibo
 Jaime Bonel González (PIP)
 Angel "Chayanne" Martínez (PNP)
 Angel Negrón (PIP)
 José "Joito" Pérez (PNP)
 Elizabeth Rosa (PPD)
 Rubén Soto (PPD)

Mayagüez-Aguadilla
 Efraín De Jesús (PPD)
 Juan Raúl Mari Pesquera (PIP)
 Edwin Morales Pérez (PPT)
 Luis Daniel Muñíz (PNP)
 Gilberto Rodríguez (PPD)
 Pedro Resto Batalla (PPT)
 Samuel Soto Bosques (PIP)
 Evelyn Vázquez (PNP)

Ponce
 Luis Berdiel (PNP)
 Nelson Cruz (PNP)
 Angel Fourquet Cordero (PPD)
 Luis Enrique Martínez (PIP)
 Heriberto Quiles (PPT)
 Juan Rafael Rosario (PIP)
 Ramón Ruiz (PPD)

Guayama
 José Bonilla Colón (PIP)
 María Yadira Díaz (PIP)
 Juan Pablo Hernández (PPD)
 Carlos Rodríguez Mateo (PNP)
 Angel Rodríguez Otero (PPD)
 Axel "Chino" Roque (PNP)

Humacao
 Javier Córdova Iturregui (PPT)
 José Luis Dalmau (PPD)
 Luis "Pickie" Díaz (PNP)
 Miguel Laureano (PNP)
 Lydia Ortíz (PIP)
 Olivero Rivera (PIP)
 José Sotero Esteva (PPT)
 Jorge Suárez Cáceres (PPD)

Carolina
 Eric Correa (PNP)
 Marisol Quiñones (PIP)
 Albert Santana (PIP)
 Angélica Molina (PPT)
 Luis Daniel Rivera (PPD)
 Pedro A. Rodríguez (PPD)
 Isaac Santiago (PPT)
 Nayda Venegas (PNP)

House of Representatives

At-large

The ballot featured sixteen (16) candidates from four different parties (bold denotes incumbent candidates)

New Progressive Party (PNP)
Néstor Alonso
José Aponte
José E. Meléndez Ortíz
María Milagros Charbonier
Lourdes Ramos
José "Pichy" Torres Zamora

Popular Democratic Party (PPD)
 Manuel Natal Albelo
 Jaime Perelló
 Luis Vega Ramos
 Jesús Manuel Ortíz
 Jorge Colberg Toro
 Brenda López de Arrarás

Other parties
 Denis Márquez (PIP)
 Félix Córdova Iturregui (PPT)

Results

Governor

The candidate from the New Progressive Party (PNP) Ricky Rosselló beat the candidate from the Popular Democratic Party (PPD) David Bernier obtaining 41.76% of the votes against 38.92% for Bernier. Most notably, the two independent candidates – Alexandra Lúgaro and Manuel Cidre – managed to arrive in third and fourth place with 11.12% and 5.73% respectively. For the fourth election in a row, the candidate of the Puerto Rican Independence Party (PIP) failed to receive the required 3% of the votes to remain registered. The same result happened to Rafael Bernabe from the Working People's Party (PPT) for the second election in a row.

Senate

|- style="background-color:#E9E9E9"
! rowspan="2" colspan="2" style="text-align:center;" | Parties
! style="text-align:center;" colspan="3" | District
! style="text-align:center;" colspan="3" | At-large
! rowspan="2" style="text-align:center;" colspan="1" | Total seats
! rowspan="2" style="text-align:center;" colspan="1" | Composition
! rowspan="2" style="text-align:center;" colspan="1" | ±
|- style="background-color:#E9E9E9"
! style="text-align:center;" | Votes
! style="text-align:center;" | %
! style="text-align:center;" | Seats
! style="text-align:center;" | Votes
! style="text-align:center;" | %
! style="text-align:center;" | Seats
|- style="text-align:right;"
| bgcolor=#0000cc width=3 |
| style="text-align:left;" | New Progressive Party (PNP)
| 1,440,050
| 50.4
| 15
| 664,553
| 45.3
| 6
| 21
| 
|  13
|- style="text-align:right;"
| bgcolor=#cc0033|
| style="text-align:left;" | Popular Democratic Party (PPD)
| 1,210,903
| 42.4
| 1
| 503,630
| 34.3
| 6
| 7
| 
|  11
|- style="text-align:right;"
| bgcolor=#33cc66 |
| style="text-align:left;" | Puerto Rican Independence Party (PIP)
| 150,904
| 5.3
| 0
| 130,583
| 8.9
| 1
| 1
| 
|  1
|- style="text-align:right;"
| bgcolor=#660099 |
| style="text-align:left;" | Working People's Party (PPT)
| 53,335
| 1.9
| 0
| 9,957
| 0.7
| 0
| 0
| 
|  0
|- style="text-align:right;"
|  |
| style="text-align:left;" | Independents
| 0
| 0.0
| 0
| 157,788
| 10.8
| 1
| 1
| 
|  1
|- style="background-color=#0000cc;text-align:right;"
|-
|align=left colspan=2|Total
| 2,855,192
| 100.0
| 16
| 1,466,511
| 100.0
| 14
| 30
|
|
|-
|align=left colspan=11|Source: CEEPUR
|}
The numbers of legislators in this senate increased from 27 to 30, because the New Progressive Party (PNP) won 21 of the 27 seats in contention, surpassing the two-thirds limit (18 seats). This automatically triggered Article Three of the Constitution of Puerto Rico which mandates that in such case new seats must be open for minority legislators. These new seats account for the number of seats the majority party surpassed (3 seats in this election).

House of Representatives

|- style="background-color:#E9E9E9"
! rowspan="2" colspan="2" style="text-align:center;" | Parties
! style="text-align:center;" colspan="3" | District
! style="text-align:center;" colspan="3" | At-large
! rowspan="2" style="text-align:center;" colspan="1" | Total seats
! rowspan="2" style="text-align:center;" colspan="1" | Composition
! rowspan="2" style="text-align:center;" colspan="1" | ±
|- style="background-color:#E9E9E9"
! style="text-align:center;" | Votes
! style="text-align:center;" | %
! style="text-align:center;" | Seats
! style="text-align:center;" | Votes
! style="text-align:center;" | %
! style="text-align:center;" | Seats
|- style="text-align:right;"
| bgcolor=#0000cc width=3 |
| style="text-align:left;" | New Progressive Party (PNP)
| 750,840
| 50.3
| 28
| 705,753
| 48.6
| 6
| 34
| 
|  11
|- style="text-align:right;"
| bgcolor=#cc0033|
| style="text-align:left;" | Popular Democratic Party (PPD)
| 644,316
| 43.2
| 12
| 605,887
| 41.7
| 4
| 16
| 
|  12
|- style="text-align:right;"
| bgcolor=#33cc66 |
| style="text-align:left;" | Puerto Rican Independence Party (PIP)
| 71,442
| 4.8
| 0
| 121,066
| 8.3
| 1
| 1
| 
|  1
|- style="text-align:right;"
| bgcolor=#660099 |
| style="text-align:left;" | Working People's Party (PPT)
| 22,169
| 1.5
| 0
| 19,537
| 1.3
| 0
| 0
| 
|  0
|- style="text-align:right;"
|  |
| style="text-align:left;" | Independents
| 3,697
| 0.2
| 0
| 0
| 0
| 0
| 0
| 
|  0
|- style="background-color=#0000cc;text-align:right;"
|-
|align=left colspan=2|Total
| 1,492,464
| 100.0
| 40
| 1,452,243
| 100.0
| 11
| 51
|
|
|-
|align=left colspan=11|Source: CEEPUR
|}

Resident Commissioner

Mayoral

Despite losing most of the Senate and the House, the Popular Democratic Party (PPD) managed to win a majority of the mayoralty races in the island, with a total of 45 out of 78 municipalities. The New Progressive Party (PNP) won a total of 33.

See also
New Progressive Party of Puerto Rico primaries, 2016
Popular Democratic Party of Puerto Rico primaries, 2016

References

2016
2016 in Puerto Rico
Puerto Rico
2016 elections in the Caribbean
2016
November 2016 events in the United States